Phaltan is a town, a tehsil, and a municipal council in the Satara district in the Indian state of Maharashtra.

History 

Phaltan was one of the non-salute Maratha princely states of British India, under the central division of the Bombay presidency. It measured 397 square miles (1,028 km2) in area. According to the 1901 census, the population decreased by 31% to 45,739; the town's population was 9,512 in that year. In 1901, the state enjoyed revenue estimated at £13,000, and paid a tribute of £640 to the British Raj. Its flag was a rectangular bicolor, orange over green.

The Hindu ruling family was descended from Naik Nimbaji Nimbalkar (1284–1291). The ruler had the title of raja or Naik Nimbalkar. The first wife, Maharani Sai Bhonsale of 17th century  Shivaji, was from Phaltan. Major HH Raja Bahadur Shrimant Malojirao Mudhojirao Nanasaheb Naik Nimbalkar IV was the last ruler of Phaltan.

Geography 
Phaltan has an average elevation of 568 meters (1,863 feet).

Phaltan's climate is an inland climate of Maharashtra. Summer in Phaltan is comparatively hot and dry when compared to neighboring inland cities.

The city receives less rainfall from June to September, and it has been declared as a drought-prone place by the government. Phaltan sometimes does not get rainfall during the rainy season.

Winter starts in Phaltan from November to February. The winter temperatures are significantly higher compared to other cities in Maharashtra such as Pune and Nashik. Humidity is low in this season.

Phaltan crosses a drought-prone area; a dry area is present to the south and south-west of Phaltan, a dry area begins. Water for drinking and irrigation is provided by the Veer Dam on the Nira river.

Demographics 
According to the 2001 Census of India, Phaltan had a population of 60,172. Males constituted 51% of the population and females 49%. Phaltan has an average literacy rate of 75%, higher than the national average of 59.5%: male literacy is 80%, and female literacy is 70%. In Phaltan, 12% of the population was under six years of age.

Culture 
In Ramayana, Phaltan was part of Dandakaranya, and Ram, Laxman, Seeta had come here during Vanvas.

Sri Ram is the local deity (Gram-daivat) of the city, and the Sri Ram Temple in Phaltan is an important landmark in the city.

Phaltan is the birth place of Shri Chakrapani Prabhu, to whom the followers of Mahanubhava Sampradaya consider as an avatara among the 5 Krishnas. 

The city also has some ancient Jain temples of historic significance.

Industry 

As a tehsil, Phaltan has two sugar factories: New Phaltan Sugar Works Ltd., Sakharwadi and Shri Ram Sahakari Sakhar Karkhana Pvt. Ltd., Phaltan.

Cummins India Ltd. has its 300-acre "mega-site" plant in Phaltan, which is being used to manufacture engines.

Education 
The Nimbkar Agricultural Research Institute is located in Phaltan. It focuses on agriculture, renewable energy, animal husbandry and sustainable development. Its work on energy self-sufficient tehsils (which became a national policy) was based on the extensive research on biomass availability in Phaltan Taluka.

Notable residents 

 Sai Bhonsale
Nandini Nimbkar
Anil K. Rajvanshi Padma Shri awardee 2022 
B. V. Nimbkar Padma Shri awardee 2006.
Shivajirao Bhosale

See also
Upalve

References 

Cities and towns in Satara district
Talukas in Maharashtra